The GCR Class 1 was a class of steam locomotives designed by John G. Robinson for the Great Central Railway, and introduced to service between December 1912 and 1913. In the 1923 grouping, they all passed to the London and North Eastern Railway which placed them in class B2. Their classification was changed to B19 in 1945, and all had been retired by the end of 1947.

Service
Although commonly believed that they were intended as express passenger locomotives, the Great Central actually classified and used them as mixed traffic locomotives. The minutes of the Locomotive Committee show that they were ordered as a superheated version of the 8F (Immingham) class mixed traffic locomotives. They were described as mixed traffic locomotives in the contemporary Great Central publication Per Rail, which promoted the company's goods services. When new, three of the class – 423, 425 and 428 – were painted in GCR's standard green passenger livery, while the other three – 424, 426 and 427 – were painted in the lined black goods livery; all were green by the end of 1922. Their initial allocations included the 'Pipe trains', the vacuum-brake fitted express goods services between Manchester and London, among the most important services on the Great Central. There is no evidence that they were intended to challenge the contemporary 11E (Director) class 4-4-0s for the generally light express passenger services of the pre-1914 years on the London Extension.

Alleged problems
It has been claimed that the GCR Class 1 had problems in service which led to their alleged demotion from express passenger use, but there appears to be no evidence to support these claims. The design of the fire grate and ash pan was very similar to, for example, the later Gresley K3 2-6-0s, and their fireboxes were deep and relatively large for their  grate area. Overheating troubles with axleboxes have been alleged, related to the large force from the inside cylinders. A more likely source of initial trouble was the marine-type big ends fitted to the first five, since the sixth reverted to strap and cotter type.

Loco details

References

External links
 LNER Encyclopedia
 

4-6-0 locomotives
2′C h2 locomotives
01
Railway locomotives introduced in 1912
Scrapped locomotives
Standard gauge steam locomotives of Great Britain
Passenger locomotives
Great Central Railway 4-6-0s